The Lysenko Music and Drama School was a private music school in Kyiv, Ukraine.  It was founded in 1899 and opened in 1904 by Ukrainian composer Mykola Lysenko.  In 1912 it became a public national university for the performing arts, now the present day Kyiv National I. K. Karpenko-Kary Theatre, Cinema and Television University.

Bandura classes
In the Fall of 1908 the first classes for the Bandura (a Ukraine stringed instrument) were begun at the Lysenko music school, enhancing Kobzarstvo culture.

Each of the students paid 3-4 rubles a month for half hour lessons. Poor students only paid 2 rubles. After the first 6 months only 17 students were left with 3 financial sponsors. The kobzar-teacher (Ivan Kuchuhura Kucherenko) received a payment of 109 rubles.

In the second half of the year the group had shrunk and consisted of 6 students (of which 3 were new) and two sponsors who were previously enrolled as students. After 4 months the kobzar-teacher received 38 rubles pay. Consequently, the kobzar at the end of April, not waiting for the end of the academic year left the position and traveled home to Kharkiv.

Ivan Kuchuhura-Kucherenko was a blind man and performed according to his feelings. He had no theoretical education nor did he have any variations in his playing technique. As a consequence it was difficult for sighted students to follow him. Interest in playing the bandura however, at that time had grown so much in some of the students that they were able to overcome these problems.

The hours in which the lessons were held were unfortunately not very convenient - from 9-11 in the morning - and the students were mainly made up of university students or public servants.

Half hour lessons were offered, however, having a teacher without a sound knowledge of teaching methodology, and a systematic approach to teaching could not produce the desired results in the students.

Apart from this there were no inexpensive banduras for the students to purchase.

In an article about the school the following solutions were suggested:
 A textbook was required and a knowledgeable teacher needed.
 Evening lessons.
 Stipends for those who could not afford lessons
 A workshop to manufacture inexpensive banduras.

See also

References
 A.K. - Do kobzars'koyi spravy - Ridnyj Kraj #12 p 4
 Encyclopediaofukraine.com: Lysenko Music and Drama School

Music schools in Ukraine
Schools in Kyiv
Music in Kyiv
Kyiv National I. K. Karpenko-Kary Theatre, Cinema and Television University
Banduras
Kobzarstvo
Educational institutions established in 1899
1899 establishments in the Russian Empire